Rowlinson is a surname. Notable people with the surname include:

Ernest Rowlinson (1882–1941), British politician
George Henry Rowlinson (1852–1937), British trade unionist
Gerard Rowlinson (born 1941), British swimmer
John Shipley Rowlinson (1926–2018), British chemist
Matthew Rowlinson (born 1956), Canadian academic
Norman Rowlinson (1923–2006), English football chairman